(literally "Club of red bracelets") is a German comedy-drama television series broadcast on VOX. Based upon the Catalan drama series , the series focuses on a group of teenagers living together as patients in a hospital's pediatric ward.

On December 5, 2016, VOX renewed the series for a third and final season. The third season premiered on November 13, 2017. The last episode of the third season aired on December 11, 2017, marking the end of the show.

Main characters
 Tim Oliver Schultz as Leo Roland; he has cancer and had leg amputated
 Damian Hardung as Jonas Neumann; he has cancer and has to amputate a leg 
 Luise Befort as Emma Wolfshagen; she suffers from anorexia
 Timur Bartels as Alex Breidtbach; he is admitted to the hospital after fainting on the playground
 Ivo Kortlang as Anton „Toni“ Vogel; he has Asperger's syndrome, he arrives at the hospital because of a motorcycle accident
 Nick Julius Schuck as Hugo Krüger; he is in a coma after jumping off a diving board; he serves as the show's narrator

Main cast

Episodes

Season 1 (2015)

Season 2 (2016)

Season 3 (2017)

Reception

Critical response
The reviews in Germany are mostly positive. According to Albert Espinosa the German Version of Polseres vermelles is the best worldwide.

Awards
2016
 Audi Generation Award 2016 – Media (Medien)
 Bayerischer Fernsehpreis 2016 – Best director (Regisseur) to Richard Huber 
 Bayerischer Fernsehpreis 2016 – Best producers (Produzenten) to Bantry Bay Productions, Gerda Müller and Jan Kromschröder
 Deutscher Fernsehpreis 2016 – Best series (Beste Serie)
 Deutscher Schauspielerpreis 2016 – Best ensemble (Bestes Ensemble)
 Eyes & Ears Awards 2016 – Best typographical design (Beste typografische Gestaltung)
 Eyes & Ears Awards 2016 – Best On-Air-Programm-Campaign: Fiction in-house production (Beste On-Air-Programm-Kampagne: Fiction Eigenproduktion)
 Grimme-Preis 2016 – Children & Youth  (Kinder & Jugend)
 Jupiter-Award 2016 – Best TV-series national (Beste TV-Serie national)
 New Faces Award Film 2016 – Special Award (Sonderpreis)
 Quotenmeter.de-Fernsehpreis 2016 – Best supporting actress of a series (Nebendarstellerin einer Serie oder Reihe) to Luise Befort 
2017
 Deutscher Fernsehpreis 2017 – Best series (Beste Serie)
 Eyes & Ears Awards 2017 – Best social spot or campaign ( Beste(r) Social Spot bzw. Kampagne)
 Jupiter-Award 2017 – Best TV-series national (Beste TV-Serie national)

See also
 List of German television series
 Polseres vermelles
 Red Band Society
 Braccialetti rossi

References

German comedy-drama television series
German medical television series
2015 German television series debuts
German-language television shows
VOX (German TV channel) original programming
Grimme-Preis for fiction winners